Younion is a trade union representing municipal workers, and workers in the media and arts, in Austria.

The union was founded in 2009, when the Union of Municipal Employees merged with the Union of Artists, Media Workers and Freelance Workers.  It was originally named the Union of Municipal Employees, Art, Media, Sport and Freelance Workers, but shortened its name in 2015.

By 2014, the union had 150,394 members, making it the fourth largest affiliate of the Austrian Trade Union Federation.  Since its formation, the union has been led by Christian Meidlinger.

Presidents
2009: Christian Meidlinger

References

External links

Trade unions in Austria
Trade unions established in 2009
Public sector trade unions